Kurshalino (Körşäle) is a rural locality (a village) in Novomeshcherovsky Selsoviet, Mechetlinsky District, Bashkortostan, Russia. The population was 236 as of 2010. There are 3 streets.

Geography 
Kurshalino is located 50 km south of Bolsheustyikinskoye (the district's administrative centre) by road. Novomeshcherovo is the nearest rural locality.

References 

Rural localities in Mechetlinsky District